The 1997 Southland Conference baseball tournament was held from May 14 to 17, 1997 to determine the champion of the Southland Conference in the sport of college baseball for the 1997 season.  The event pitted the top six finishers from the conference's regular season in a double-elimination tournament held at Warhawk Field, home field of Northeast Louisiana in Monroe, Louisiana.  Second-seeded  won their first championship and claimed the automatic bid to the 1997 NCAA Division I baseball tournament.

Seeding and format
The top six finishers from the regular season were seeded one through six.  They played a double-elimination tournament.

Bracket and results

All-Tournament Team
The following players were named to the All-Tournament Team.

Most Valuable Player
Jeremy Fikac was named Tournament Most Valuable Player.  Fikac was a pitcher for Southwest Texas State.

References

Tournament
Southland Conference Baseball Tournament
Southland Conference baseball tournament
Southland Conference baseball tournament